"The Adventure of the Speckled Band" is one of 56 short Sherlock Holmes stories written by Sir Arthur Conan Doyle, the eighth story of twelve in the collection The Adventures of Sherlock Holmes. It was originally published in Strand Magazine in February 1892.

"The Speckled Band" is a classic locked-room mystery that deals with the themes of parental greed, inheritance and freedom. Tinged with Gothic elements, it is considered by many to be one of Doyle's finest works, with the author himself calling it his best story. The story, alongside the rest of the Sherlock Holmes canon, has become a defining part of detective fiction. It has been adapted for television, film, theatre, radio, and a video game. It is also part of the exhibit at the Sherlock Holmes Museum. The theatrical adaptation was written and produced by Doyle himself, directed by and starring Lyn Harding as Grimesby Roylott. The role of Sherlock Holmes was played by H. A. Saintsbury. Doyle famously clashed with Harding over several details of the script, but later reconciled with him after the universal success of the play.

Plot summary
In April 1883 Sherlock Holmes and Dr. Watson rise early one morning to meet a young woman named Helen Stoner who fears that her stepfather, Dr. Grimesby Roylott, is threatening her life. Roylott is a doctor who practiced in Calcutta, India, and was married to Helen's late mother 30 years before when she was a wealthy widow living there. He is also the impoverished last survivor of what was once a extremly wealthy but violent, ill-tempered and amoral Anglo-Saxon aristocratic family of Surrey, and has already served a jail sentence for killing his Indian butler in a rage. After serving his jail sentence Roylott had moved to England and tried to reestablish his practice but gave it up after his wife was killed in a railroad accident eight years before. At his estate of Stoke Moran Roylott with a violent temper and great physical strength becomes the terror of the town in which he engages in brawls including throwing the local blacksmith into a stream.

Helen's twin sister Julia died almost two years earlier, shortly before she was to be married. Helen had heard her sister's dying words, "The speckled band!" but could not decode their meaning. Helen herself is now engaged. She has begun to hear strange noises and observe strange activities around Stoke Moran, the impoverished and heavily mortgaged estate where she and her stepfather live.

Dr. Roylott also keeps strange company at the estate. He is friendly with a band of Gypsies on the property, and he has a cheetah and a baboon as pets. For some time, he has been making changes to the house. Before Helen's sister's death, he had modifications made inside the house and is now having the outside wall repaired, forcing Helen to move into the room where her sister died.

Holmes listens carefully to Helen's story and agrees to take the case. He plans a visit to the manor later in the day. Before he can leave, he is visited by Dr. Roylott himself, who threatens him should he interfere. Undaunted, Holmes proceeds to the courthouse, where he examines Helen's late mother's will, and then to the countryside.

At Stoke Moran, Holmes scrutinizes the premises inside and out. Among the strange features that he discovers are a bed anchored to the floor, a bell cord that is not attached to any bell, and a ventilator hole between Helen's temporary room and that of Dr. Roylott.

Holmes and Watson arrange to spend the night in Helen's room. In darkness, they wait until about three in the morning; suddenly, a slight metallic noise and a dim light through the ventilator prompt Holmes to action. Quickly lighting a candle, he discovers on the bell cord the "speckled band"—a venomous snake. He strikes at the snake with his riding crop, driving it back through the ventilator. Agitated, it fatally attacks Roylott, who had been waiting for it to return after killing Helen. Holmes identifies the snake as an Indian swamp adder and reveals to Watson the motive: the late wife's will which had provided an annual income of £1,100 but had dropped to annual income of  £750 sterling [when she passed way], of which each daughter could claim one third (£250) upon marriage. Thus, Dr. Roylott plotted to remove both of his stepdaughters before they married to avoid losing most of the fortune he controlled. Holmes admits his attack on the snake may make him indirectly responsible for Roylott's demise, but he does not foresee it troubling him.

Inspirations
Richard Lancelyn Green, the editor of the 2000 Oxford paperback edition of The Adventures of Sherlock Holmes, surmises that Doyle's source for the story appears to have been the article named "Called on by a Boa Constrictor. A West African Adventure" in Cassell's Saturday Journal, published in February 1891. In the article, a captain tells how he was dispatched to a remote camp in [West Africa] to stay in a tumbledown cabin that belonged to a Portuguese trader. On the first night in the cabin, he is awoken by a creaking sound, and sees "a dark queer-looking thing hanging down through the ventilator above it". It turns out to be the largest [Boa constrictor] he has seen (more likely a python because there are no boas in Africa). He is paralysed with fear as the serpent comes down into the room. Unable to cry out for help, the captain spots an old bell that hung from a projecting beam above one of the windows. The bell cord had rotted away, but by means of a stick he manages to ring it and raise the alarm.

Identity of 'The Speckled Band'
"It is a swamp adder!" cried Holmes; "the deadliest snake in India. He has died within ten seconds of being bitten."

Most people consider the snake to be a fictitious creation; however, the identity of the snake has been a subject of much debate among Sherlockians.

The key characteristics to be considered in identification of the snake are:
 A fast-acting neurotoxic venom, as opposed to the common haemotoxic venom of most snakes
 Ability to climb well
 Appearance described as a "yellow band with brownish speckles", a "squat, diamond-shaped" head, and a "puffed" neck
 An Indian origin

The below candidates have been considered.

Source: The New Annotated Sherlock Holmes by Leslie S Klinger

Publication history
"The Adventure of the Speckled Band" was first published in the UK in The Strand Magazine in February 1892, and in the United States in the US edition of the Strand in March 1892. The story was published with nine illustrations by Sidney Paget in The Strand Magazine. It was included in the short story collection The Adventures of Sherlock Holmes, which was published in October 1892.

Adaptations

Theatre
Conan Doyle wrote an adaptation for the stage in 1910, The Speckled Band. It premiered at the Adelphi Theatre, London on 4 June 1910, under the name The Stonor Case.
In autumn 2013, a new stage adaptation, Sherlock Holmes and the Speckled Band, by Max Gee premiered at Treasurer's House, York and Ripley Castle, Ripley, North Yorks. The play was produced by Theatre Mill, directed by Samuel Wood, and starred Liam Tims as Holmes and Adam Elms as Watson.

Film
The short story was also adapted for the now-lost 1912 British-French short film The Speckled Band as part of the Éclair film series featuring Georges Tréville as Sherlock Holmes.
A 1923 silent short film was adapted in the Stoll film series starring Eille Norwood as Holmes.
The 1931 film, The Speckled Band, starring Raymond Massey as the detective was an adaptation of Conan Doyle's stage play, with Lyn Harding reprising his role as Grimesby Roylott.
The 1944 film The Spider Woman is based on several Holmes stories, among them "The Speckled Band."

Radio and audio dramas
The premiere episode of The Adventures of Sherlock Holmes featured an adaptation of the story on 20 October 1930 and starred William Gillette as Holmes and Leigh Lovell as Watson. The production was adapted by Edith Meiser. A remake of the script aired on 17 September 1931, with Richard Gordon playing Sherlock Holmes and Leigh Lovell again playing Dr. Watson. Another dramatisation of the story aired in February 1933 with Gordon and Lovell, though it is unclear if this was a repeated recording or a new production. A remake of the script aired on 1 February 1936, with Gordon as Holmes and Harry West as Watson. 
A half-hour radio adaptation starring Basil Rathbone and Nigel Bruce was broadcast as an episode of the series The New Adventures of Sherlock Holmes on 16 October 1939, again adapted by Edith Meiser. Other episodes adapted from the story also aired in March 1941, October 1943, and November 1945, again with Rathbone and Bruce playing Holmes and Watson respectively. A half-hour radio adaptation starring Tom Conway as Holmes and Bruce as Watson was broadcast on 23 June 1947. A half-hour radio adaptation starring John Stanley as Holmes and Wendell Holmes (using the pseudonym "George Spelvin") as Watson aired as an episode of the same series on 19 December 1948, and was adapted by Max Ehrlich.
A 1945 BBC Home Service adaptation, dramatised by John Dickson Carr, starred Cedric Hardwicke as Holmes and Finlay Currie as Watson.
A 1948 radio adaptation on the Home Service, also adapted by John Dickson Carr, featured Howard Marion-Crawford as Holmes, with Finlay Currie again playing Watson. Howard Marion-Crawford later played Watson in the 1954–1955 television series Sherlock Holmes.
A radio adaptation with John Gielgud as Holmes and Ralph Richardson as Watson aired in 1955 on NBC radio.
A half-hour BBC radio adaptation was broadcast in July 1962 on the BBC Light Programme, as part of the 1952–1969 radio series starring Carleton Hobbs as Holmes and Norman Shelley as Watson. Michael Hardwick adapted the production.
In 1970, an audio drama based on the story was released on LP record, as one of several recordings starring Robert Hardy as Holmes and Nigel Stock as Watson. It was dramatised and produced by Michael Hardwick (who also adapted the 1962 radio adaptation) and Mollie Hardwick.
A one-hour radio adaptation was broadcast as an episode of the series CBS Radio Mystery Theater on 28 June 1977. The episode starred Kevin McCarthy as Sherlock Holmes and Court Benson as Dr. Watson.
A BBC Radio 4 dramatisation adapted by Vincent McInerney aired on 9 January 1991, as part of the 1989–1998 radio series starring Clive Merrison as Holmes and Michael Williams as Watson. It also featured Susan Wooldridge as Helen Stoner.
 In June 2011 Big Finish Productions produced a reading of the story as Sherlock Holmes: The Speckled Band starring Nicholas Briggs as Sherlock Holmes and Richard Earl as Dr. Watson.
 The story was adapted as a 2015 episode of the radio series The Classic Adventures of Sherlock Holmes, with John Patrick Lowrie as Holmes and Lawrence Albert as Watson.
A one-hour Bengali adaptation by Radio Mirchi, Kolkata starring Mir Afsar Ali broadcast as an episode of Sunday Suspense on 1 May 2016.

Television
A half-hour television adaptation starring Alan Napier and Melville Cooper was broadcast as the tenth episode of the NBC Television series Your Show Time on 25 March 1949. This is one of the earliest known television appearances of Holmes.
The pilot episode of the BBC's 1964–1965 series Sherlock Holmes was a new version of "The Speckled Band", airing in May 1964 as part of the Detective anthology series. The episode was written by Giles Cooper, was directed by Robin Midgley, and starred Douglas Wilmer as Holmes, Nigel Stock as Watson and Felix Felton as Roylott.
"The Speckled Band" was adapted for the screen in the USSR in 1979 with Vasily Livanov as Sherlock Holmes and Vitaly Solomin as Doctor Watson.
"The Speckled Band" was the sixth episode of the first series of Holmes adaptations by Granada Television starring Jeremy Brett as Holmes and David Burke as Watson, first broadcast in 1984.
"The Speckled Band" was adapted as part of the 1984–85 anime series Sherlock Hound. In this version, Moriarty poses as Roylott to steal Helen's money, and Hound gets involved when his motorcar breaks down and must stay at their home for the night.
Kōki Mitani adapted "The Adventure of the Speckled Band" and "The Creeping Man" to an episode in the NHK puppetry series Sherlock Holmes. One night a swamp adder with crocus-shaped speckles is found in Beeton School. On the next day, trainee teacher Helen Stoner visits Holmes and Watson in 221B of Baker Dormitory and tells them about the strange behaviour of Grimesby Roylott who teaches chemistry. That night they find out what his behaviour means but Sherman, a female pupil is attacked by the adder.
 The animated television series Sherlock Holmes in the 22nd Century featured an adaptation of the story, "The Scales of Justice".

Video games
 The Great Ace Attorney: Adventures adapted "The Speckled Band" into the game's second episode, "The Adventure of the Unbreakable Speckled Band". In the episode, the protagonist, Ryunosuke Naruhodo, aids Herlock Sholmes (named "Sherlock Holmes" in the original Japanese released; changed in localisation for legal reasons) in the investigation, the protagonist's best friend, Kazuma Asogi, takes the place as the victim, and the culprit's true identity is changed to a Russian asylum seeker who was only going by the alias of Roylott to hide her identity. In the middle of the case, Sholmes deduces the story's original conclusion. However, Ryunosuke's partner, Susato Mikotoba, points out the numerous issues regarding the biology of snakes. Thanks to Ryunosuke, it is eventually deduced that the victim's death was caused by him tripping over a cat after being shoved, and that the "speckled band" refers to a cat teaser toy. Later in the game's fourth episode; "The Adventure of the Clouded Kokoro" has Herlock's assistant, Iris Wilson, adapt the events into "The Speckled Band", but changes some details around to make it more interesting to the audience such as by making the snake the murder weapon, fully aware that this wouldn't make sense considering the biology of snakes.

References
Notes

Sources

External links

  "The Adventure of the Speckled Band" at Google Books
 
The full text of The Adventure of the Speckled Band at the Internet Archive

1892 short stories
Fictional snakes
Speckled Band, The Adventure of the
Works originally published in The Strand Magazine
Locked-room mysteries
Short stories adapted into films
Fiction set in 1883